Dating in the Dark is a British dating game show that first aired on Sky Living from 9 September 2009 to 5 July 2011 and then on ITV2 from 15 September to 20 October 2016.

Transmissions

External links

2009 British television series debuts
2016 British television series endings
2000s British reality television series
2010s British reality television series
2000s British game shows
2010s British game shows
British dating and relationship reality television series
British television series revived after cancellation
English-language television shows
ITV game shows
Sky Living original programming
Television game shows with incorrect disambiguation
Television series by Banijay
Television series by ITV Studios